The 2003–04 Scottish Second Division was won by Airdrie United who, along with Hamilton Academical, were promoted to the First Division. East Fife and Stenhousemuir were relegated to the Third Division.

Table

Top scorers

Attendances

The average attendances for Scottish Second Division clubs for season 2003/04 are shown below:

Scottish Second Division seasons
2
3
Scot